Enrique Iturra Díaz (27 June 1946 – 10 November 2021) was a Chilean professional footballer who played as a centre back for clubs in Chile, Mexico and El Salvador.

Club career
Iturra came to Pedro Aguirre Cerda commune at the age of 4 and played for the local clubs Enrico Caruso and Cultural Pedro Aguirre Cerda. A product of Unión Española youth system, in his country of birth he played for Trasandino, Naval, Ferroviarios and Santiago Morning.

He emigrated to Mexico in 1973 looking for a chance in the Mexican football, getting trials in both América thanks to Carlos Reinoso and Cruz Azul thanks to Alberto Quintano, but he finally joined Pachuca and made his debut playing alongside the Mexican Javier Bazán in a match where he was sent off.

Then he moved to El Salvador, met his compatriot Miguel Hermosilla and played for Alianza, Deportivo Tapachulteca and Sonsonate, his last club in 1976.

Personal life
As a child, Iturra was nicknamed El Cabeza de Juguera (The Blender Head), but he is better known by the nickname that gave him when he was a player of Ferroviarios, El Chacal Iturra (The Jackal), due to the fact that he injured to a player of Naval with a sweep.

He married in El Salvador with María Elena Rodas and had two children, Antonio José and Anabella. Back in Chile, they separated.

Outside of a football field, he was known for a controversial personality, in addition to have fell into alcoholism and suffered for the deaths of his father and his brother. In 1991, he was stabbed by a drug addict and fell into depression. Thanks to his friend Miguel Merello, a journalist who said him "you have reached further than anyone could have thought, others did better, but nobody gave a peso for you", he moved forward and spent time as a motivational speaker and therapist on public buses.

He died on 10 November 2021 due to multiple health issues.

References

External links
 Enrique Iturra at playmakerstats.com (English version of ceroacero.es)

1946 births
2021 deaths
Footballers from Santiago
Chilean footballers
Chilean expatriate footballers
Trasandino footballers
Naval de Talcahuano footballers
Ferroviarios footballers
Santiago Morning footballers
C.F. Pachuca players
Alianza F.C. footballers
Primera B de Chile players
Liga MX players
Salvadoran Primera División players
Chilean expatriate sportspeople in Mexico
Chilean expatriate sportspeople in El Salvador
Expatriate footballers in Mexico
Expatriate footballers in El Salvador
Association football defenders
Place of birth missing